Twenty Million Sweethearts is a 1934 American Pre-Code musical comedy film directed by Ray Enright and starring Pat O'Brien, Dick Powell, Ginger Rogers, and The Mills Brothers. The film was remade in 1949 as My Dream Is Yours.

Plot
Agent Russell Edward 'Rush' Blake (Pat O'Brien) is able to promote the singing tenor waiter Buddy Clayton (Dick Powell) as a major radio star whilst Buddy's wife Peggy Cornell (Ginger Rogers) loses out. In the end, Peggy does not lose Buddy to his "twenty million sweethearts" – his female fans.

Cast
 Pat O'Brien as Russell Edward 'Rush' Blake
 Dick Powell as Buddy Clayton
 Ginger Rogers as Peggy Cornell
 Ted Fio Rito as himself
 Allen Jenkins as 'Uncle' Pete
 Grant Mitchell as Chester A. Sharpe
 Joseph Cawthorn as Mr. Herbert 'Herbie' Brokman
 Joan Wheeler as Marge, the Receptionist
 Henry O'Neill as Lemuel Tappan
 Johnny Arthur as Norma Hanson's Secretary
 The Mills Brothers as Themselves
 The Radio Rogues as Themselves
 George Chandler as Johnny Klinger, radio columnist (uncredited)

Music
The film features the well-known song "I'll String Along with You" by Harry Warren and Al Dubin.

Reception
The film was considered a box office disappointment for Warner Bros. According to studio records, it earned $821,000 domestically and $392,000 foreign.

References

External links
 
 
 
 

1934 films
1934 musical comedy films
American musical comedy films
American black-and-white films
1930s English-language films
Films directed by Ray Enright
First National Pictures films
Warner Bros. films
1930s American films